Greg McKeown is a retired American soccer forward who played in the North American Soccer League and American Soccer League.

McKeown attended the University of San Francisco, playing on the men's soccer team from 1973 to 1977. In 1976, he scored a goal and assisted on another as the Dons won the NCAA Men's Division I Soccer Championship.

In 1977, McKeown captained the Dons to a second consecutive Division I championship.

In 1977, the San Jose Earthquakes selected McKeown in the first round of the North American Soccer League.  He played two first-team games over two seasons.  In 1980-1981, he played for the Sacramento Gold of the American Soccer League.

In 1989, he was co-owner of the Sacramento Senators of the Western Soccer League.

In 2003, McKeown was inducted into the University of San Francisco sports hall of fame.

Greg McKeown is the CFO for Somerston Estate and Wine Company in Napa Valley.

References

External links
 NASL stats

Living people
American soccer players
American Soccer League (1933–1983) players
American soccer chairmen and investors
Carolina Lightnin' players
Charlotte Gold players
North American Soccer League (1968–1984) players
Sacramento Gold (1976–1980) players
San Francisco Dons men's soccer players
San Jose Earthquakes (1974–1988) players
United Soccer League (1984–85) players
Association football forwards
Year of birth missing (living people)